Oktyabrsky is a rural locality (a settlement) and the administrative center of Oktyabrsky Selsoviet of Zonalny District, Altai Krai, Russia. The population was 1,137 as of 2016. There are 13 streets.

Geography 
Oktyabrsky is located 9 km northeast of Zonalnoye (the district's administrative centre) by road. Voskhod is the nearest rural locality.

Ethnicity 
The village is inhabited by Russians and others.

References 

Rural localities in Zonalny District